Nuestra Belleza Aguascalientes 2010, was held at the Teatro Víctor Sandoval in Aguascalientes, Aguascalientes on July 30, 2010. At the conclusion of the final night of competition, Estefanía Herrera of the capital city Aguascalientes was crowned the winner. Herrera  was crowned by outgoing Nuestra Belleza Aguascalientes titleholder, Abigail González. Seven contestants competed for the state title.

Results

Placements

Contestants

References

External links
Official Website

Nuestra Belleza México